The Archiud is a left tributary of the river Dipșa in Romania. It flows through the Budurleni Reservoir, and discharges into the Dipșa in the village Dipșa.

References

Rivers of Romania
Rivers of Bistrița-Năsăud County